American garage rock musician Ty Segall has released twelve studio albums, two live albums, four compilation albums, three extended plays (EPs), nineteen singles, and sixteen music videos. He has also recorded as a member of various other bands.

Albums

Studio albums

Other albums
Horn the Unicorn (Original Release) – Cassette (2008; Wizard Mountain)
Halfnonagon (split with Superstitions) – Cassette (2008; Wizard Mountain)
Swag / Sitting in the Back of a Morris Marina Parked at the Pier Eating Sandwiches Whilst The Rain Drums on the Roof (split with Black Time) – LP (2009; Telephone Explosion Records)
Horn the Unicorn (Re-release with Addition Tracks) – LP (2009; HBSP-2X)
Ty Segall & Lemons – Cassette (2010; Burger Records)
$ingles – Cassette (2010; Psychic Snerts)
San Francisco Rock Compilation or Food or Weird Beer From Microsoft – Limited Release, only 350 copies made – Cassette/LP (2010; God? Records issued cassette only / 2011; Social Music Records issued LP only)
Live in Aisle Five – LP (2011; Southpaw Records)
Singles 2007–2010 – Double LP/CD (2011; Goner Records)
Gemini (Demo version of Twins) – LP (2013; Drag City; Sea Note)
$INGLE$ 2 – LP, CD, cassette, MP3/FLAC digital download (2014; Drag City)
Live in San Francisco (as Ty Segall Band) – LP, CD, MP3 (2015; Drag City)
Ty Rex (2015; Goner Records)
Fudge Sandwich - CD/LP (2018; In The Red Records)
Orange Rainbow - Cassette (2018; God? Records)
Deforming Lobes (as Ty Segall and Freedom Band) – LP, CD, Cassette, MP3 (2019; Drag City)
Pig Man Lives Volume 1 - 4xLP (2019; Sea Note)
Whirlybird - soundtrack album to Whirlybird (2022; Drag City)

Collaborative studio albums

Other releases
Pop Song (with Mikal Cronin) – 7" (2009; Goodbye Boozy Records)
Group Flex (with Mikal Cronin) - Compilation contribution, tracks 'Fame' and 'Suffragette City', 6 x Flexi Disc/Book (2011; Castle Face)

Singles and EPs
Skin – 7" (2008; Goodbye Boozy Records)
It – 7" (2008; Chocolate Covered Records)
Cents – 7" (2009; Goner Records)
Universal Momma – 7" (2009; True Panther)
My Sunshine – 7" (2009; Trouble in Mind)
The Drag / Maria Stacks (split with Thee Oh Sees) – 7" (2009; Castle Face)
Caesar – 7" (2010; Goner Records)
4 Way Split (split with CoCoComa, The White Wires, & Charlie and The Moonhearts) – 7" (2010; Trouble in Mind)
GonerFest Seven Golden Ticket Record (split with Armitage Shanks, UV Race, & Strapping Field Hands) – 7" (2010; Goner Records)
Diamond Way / My Head Explodes (split with JEFF the Brotherhood) – 7" (2010; Infinity Cat Recordings)
Bruise Cruise Vol. 1 (split with Thee Oh Sees) – 7" (2010; Bruise Cruise Records)
Ty Rex EP – 12" (2011; Goner Records)
I Can't Feel It – 7" (2011; Drag City)
Spiders – 7" (2011; Drag City)
Tour Split (split with Feeling of Love) – 7" (2012; Permanent Records)
The Hill – 7" (2012; Drag City)
Would You Be My Love? – 7" (2013; Drag City)
Ty Rex II EP – 7" (2013; Goner Records)
Music From a Film 1 (split with Chad & The Meatbodies) – 7" (2013; Famous Class Records)
Feel – 7" (2014; Drag City)
Motörhead / Paranoid – 7" (2014; Drag City) - as Ty Segall Band
Mr. Face EP – 7" (2015; Famous Class Records)
Sentimental Goblin EP - 7" (2017; Suicide Squeeze Records)
Fried Shallots EP - 12" (2017; Drag City)
Alta / Meaning (2017; Drag City)

Compilation appearances
Yeti Eight (Contributes Tracks: 2 – Lovely One (Demo)& 16 – I Think I've Had It) – CD (2009; Yeti Publishing LLC)
Our Boy Roy (Contributes Track: Pretty Woman) – LP (2010; Telephone Explosion Records)
In a Cloud: New Sounds of San Francisco (Contributes Track: Hey Big Mouth) – LP (2010; Secret Seven Records)
Stuffs Vol. 1 (Contributes Track: Flys Better) – LP (2010; Compost Modern Art Recordings)
Live At The Empty Bottle (Contributes Track: Girlfriend (live)) – LP (2012; Shimby Presents)
Live at Death By Audio 2012 (Contributes Track: Imaginary Person (live)) – 7" Flexi Book (2013; Famous Class Records)

Music videos
Cents (2009)
Lovely One (2009)
Pretty Baby (You're So Ugly) (2010)
Girlfriend (2011)
Goodbye Bread (2011)
Where Your Head Goes (2011)
My Head Explodes (2012)
The Hill (2012)
Thank God for Sinners (2013)
Fuzz's Fourth Dream (2013)
The Man Man (2013)
Manipulator (2014)
The Singer (2014)
Emotional Mugger (2016)
Candy Sam (2016)
Californian Hills (2016)
Break a Guitar (2017)
Taste (2019)

As a member of other bands

Epsilons
Evil Robots – CD/EP (2005, Modern Sleeze)
Epsilons / Hips (split with Hips) – 7" (2006; olFactory Records)
Epsilons – CD/LP (2006; Retard Disco issued CD only / Young Cubs issued LP only)
Killed 'Em Deader 'N A Six Card Poker Hand – CD/LP (2007; Retard Disco issued CD only / HBSP-2X issued LP only)

Party Fowl
Scum Fuck Revolt: A GG Allin Tribute compilation (Contributes Track: Die When You Die) – CD (2006; Husk Records)
Washed Shores compilation (Contributes Track: Portage 53) – Cassette (200?; Seafoam Records)
Party Fowl – 7" (2008; Post Present Medium)
STD's – 7" (2008; Goodbye Boozy Records)

The Traditional Fools
The Primate Five vs The Traditional Fools (split with The Primate Five) – 7" (2007; Goodbye Boozy Records)
The Traditional Fools – 7" (2007; Chocolate Covered Records)
The Traditional Fools – LP (2008; Wizard Mountain/Make A Mess Records)

The Perverts
The Perverts – 7" (2009; HBSP-2X)

Sic Alps
"Breadhead" – 7" (2011; Drag City Records)

Fuzz
This Time I Got A Reason/Fuzz's Fourth Dream – 7" (2012, Trouble In Mind)
Sleigh Ride/You Won't See Me – 7" (2013, In the Red)
Live in San Francisco EP – 12" (2013, Castle Face Records)
Fuzz (2013, In the Red)
Sunderberry Dream/21st Century Schizoid Man – 7" (2013, In the Red)
Till the End of the Day (Kinks cover) – 7" (2014, Famous Class)
II – (2015, In the Red)
III - (2020, In the Red)

GØGGS
GØGGS - LP (2016, In the Red)
Pre Strike Sweep - LP (2018, In the Red)

The C.I.A
The C.I.A Demo – Cassette (2018, Self-Released)
The C.I.A – LP (2018, In the Red)
Surgery Channel – LP (2023, In the Red)

Wasted Shirt
Fungus II - LP (2020, Famous Class)

Other appearances
with Dave Davies
"Livin' in the Past" (2013)

References

discography
Discographies of American artists
Rock music discographies